Mariano Acha (11 November 1799 - 16 September 1841) was a soldier who fought in the Argentine Civil Wars.

On 20 March 1841 the four hundred men led by Colonel Mariano Acha were surprised by troops under General Nazario Benavídez and scattered.
In the Battle of Angaco on 16 August 1841, Acha defeated Benavides.
Acha defended San Juan against the forces supporting Juan Manuel de Rosas, but after 48 hours surrendered on 22 August 1841.
On 21 September 1841 he was executed.
Although he had surrendered on condition that his life would be spared, he was shot dead by a firing squad. Acha's body was decapitated and his head displayed for public view.

References
Citations

Sources 

1799 births
1841 deaths
Governors of San Juan Province, Argentina
Argentine generals
People executed by Argentina by firing squad